Andrés Bello is one of the 21 municipalities (municipios) that makes up the Venezuelan state of Miranda and, according to a 2007 population estimate by the National Institute of Statistics of Venezuela, the municipality has a population of 25,208.  The town of San José de Barlovento is the shire town of the Andrés Bello Municipality. The municipality is one of a number in Venezuela named "Andrés Bello Municipality", in honour of the writer Andrés Bello.

Demographics
The Andrés Bello Municipality, according to a 2007 population estimate by the National Institute of Statistics of Venezuela, has a population of 25,208 (up from 21,725 in 2000). This amounts to 0.9% of the state's population.

Government
The mayor of the Andrés Bello Municipality is Albaro Ramón Hidalgo Rudas, elected on October 31, 2004, with 50% of the vote.  He replaced Ramon Lobo shortly after the elections.  The municipality is divided into two parishes; San José de Barlovento and Cumbo.

References

Municipalities of Miranda (state)